Psalm 135 of the biblical Book of Psalms begins and ends "Praise ye the LORD" (hallelujah). The New King James Version entitles it "Praise to God in Creation and Redemption". In the numbering system used in the Greek Septuagint and Latin Vulgate translations, it is Psalm 134.

Allusions to other psalms and OT passages
Cyril Rodd notes references to Psalm 134 in verses 2 and 21, to Deuteronomy 32:36 (the Song of Moses) in verse 14, and to Exodus 19:5 and Deuteronomy 7:6 in verse 4, and "a close similarity" between verses 15-20 and Psalm 115:4-11. Verse 7 is reflected in Jeremiah 10:13.

Uses

Judaism
The feasts of Tabernacles and of Passover have been put forward as suggested suitable occasions for the use of this psalm.
This psalm is recited in its entirety during the Pesukei Dezimra on Shabbat, Yom Tov, and  - in many communities - on Hoshana Rabbah, and on the fifth day of Passover in some traditions.
Verse 13 is the fifth verse of Yehi Kivod in Pesukei Dezimra. Verse 4 is the fifteenth verse of Yehi Kivod.
Verse 21 is the second verse of Baruch Hashem L'Olam in Pesukei Dezimra and Baruch Hashem L'Olam during Maariv.

New Testament
Verse 14a is quoted in Hebrews .

Eastern Orthodox Church
Along with Psalm 136 (LXX numbers as 134 and 135 respectively) is called the Polyeleos or translated to "Many Mercies", named such after the refrain used "for His mercy endures forever". The Polyeleos is sung at Orthros (Matins) of a Feast Day and at Vigils. In some Slavic traditions and on Mount Athos it is read every Sunday at Orthros.
On Mount Athos it is considered one of the most joyful periods of Matins-Liturgy, and the highest point of Matins. In Athonite practice, all the candles are lit, and the chandeliers are made to swing as the Psalms are sung, it is also accompanied by a joyful peal of the bells and censing of the church, sometimes with a hand censer which has many bells on it.
At vigils, it accompanies the opening of the Royal Doors and a great censing of the nave by the Priest(s) or Deacon(s).

See also
Plagues of Egypt
Related Bible parts: Jeremiah 10

References

External links

 in Hebrew and English - Mechon-mamre
 King James Bible - Wikisource

135
Shacharit for Shabbat and Yom Tov